The 1990–91 Princeton Tigers men's basketball team represented Princeton University in NCAA Division I men's college basketball during the 1990–91 NCAA Division I men's basketball season. Their head coach was Pete Carril, and the team captain was Kit Mueller. The team played its home games in the Jadwin Gymnasium on the University campus in Princeton, New Jersey.  The team was the undefeated champion of the Ivy League, which earned them an automatic invitation to the 64-team 1991 NCAA tournament, where they were seeded eighth in the East Region.

The team posted a 24–3 overall record and a 14–0 conference record using the Princeton offense.  When the team beat  55–27 on January 11, 1991, it established a new National Collegiate Athletic Association Division I record for fewest points allowed (since 1986), breaking its own record set the prior year.  The record would last until March 2, 1992. On February 8, 1991, against , Sean Jackson made all five of his three-point field goal attempts, which tied the Ivy League single-game record for most made without a miss set three years earlier by Princeton Tigers Dave Orlandini and Bob Scrabis.  These stood as unsurpassed as the Ivy League record until future Princeton Tigers head coach Sydney Johnson made all six for Princeton on February 28, 1997. In a March 15, 1991 NCAA Division I men's basketball tournament East Regional first round game at the Carrier Dome in Syracuse, New York, against the Villanova Wildcats, they lost by a 50–48 margin. The Tigers led 30–25 at halftime, but lost on a shot in the final second of regulation play. Princeton's number eight seed was a record for the highest seed by an Ivy League school at the time.

During the season, the team spent six weeks (one week in mid December and the final five weeks of the season) of the seventeen-week season ranked in the Associated Press Top Twenty-five Poll, peaking at number eighteen where it ended the season. The team finished the season ranked twentieth in the final UPI Coaches' Poll.

The team was led by first team All-Ivy League selections Jackson and  Mueller, who repeated as the Ivy League Men's Basketball Player of the Year while earning first team Academic All-America recognition from College Sports Information Directors of America.  Mueller shot 62.5% on his field goals to earn the third of three Ivy League statistical championships for field goal percentage. Jackson led the Ivy League in three point shooting percentage in conference games with a 55.4% average and established the Ivy League single-season record for conference games with 56 made.  The team won the third of twelve consecutive national statistical championships in scoring defense with a 48.9 points allowed average.

Regular season
The team posted a 24-3 (14-0 Ivy League) record.

! = North Coast Tournament at Cleveland
@ = Manufacturers Hanover Classic at New Rochelle, N.Y.
 # = Cable Car Classic at Santa Clara, Calif.
$ = NCAA East Regional at Syracuse, N.Y.

Home games in CAPS

Rankings

NCAA tournament
The team was seeded eighth in the 1991 NCAA Division I men's basketball tournament.

NCAA Tournament
3/15/91 in Syracuse, N.Y.: (9) Villanova 50, (8) Princeton 48

Awards and honors
 Kit Mueller
 Ivy League Men's Basketball Player of the Year
 First Team All-Ivy League
 Academic All-America
 Sean Jackson
 First Team All-Ivy League
 Chris Marquardt
 Honorable Mention All-Ivy League

References

Princeton Tigers men's basketball seasons
Princeton Tigers
Princeton
Prince
Prince